Christian most often refers to:

 Christians, people who follow or adhere to Christianity
 pertaining to Christianity

Christian or The Christian may also refer to:

Arts and entertainment

Film
 Christian (1939 film), a Czech comedy film
 Christian (1989 film), a Danish drama film
 The Christian (1911 film), an Australian silent film
 The Christian (1914 film), an American silent film directed by Frederick A. Thomson
 The Christian (1915 film), a British silent film directed by George Loane Tucker 
 The Christian (1923 film), an American silent film drama directed by Maurice Tourneur

Music
 "Christian" (song), a 1982 song by China Crisis 
 Christian the Christian, a 2004 album by Lackthereof
 The Christians (band), a UK band from Liverpool, formed 1985

Other uses in arts and entertainment
 The Christian, an 1897 novel and play by Hall Caine, adapted for Broadway
 The Christian (magazine), the title of several magazines
 Christian, the protagonist in John Bunyan's novel The Pilgrim's Progress

People
 Christian (given name), including a list of people and fictional characters with the given name
 Christian (surname), including a list of people with the surname
 Christian of Clogher (d. 1138), saint and Irish bishop
 Christian of Oliva, a 13th-century Cistercian monk
 Christian (bishop of Aarhus), fl. c. 1060 to c. 1102
 Christian (footballer, born 1995) (Christian Savio Machado)
 Christian (footballer, born 2000) (Christian Roberto Alves Cardoso)
 Christian (singer) (Gaetano Cristiano Rossi, born 1949)
 Christian, ring name of professional wrestler Christian Cage (William Jason Reso, born November 30, 1973)
 Prince Christian (disambiguation)
 Christian I (disambiguation)
 Christian II (disambiguation)
 Christian III (disambiguation)

Other uses
 Christian the lion (born 1969)
 Christian, West Virginia, a place in the U.S.

See also

 The Christians (disambiguation)
 St. Jude storm of 2013, also called Cyclone Christian
 Christian Doctrine in United States federal law, arising from G. L. Christian and Associates v. United States